Sir Lionel Pilkington, 5th Baronet (c.1707 – 11 August 1778) was a British Member of Parliament.

He was the eldest son of Sir Lyon Pilkington, 4th Baronet of Stanley, near Wakefield, Yorkshire and educated at Westminster School (1721) and Christ Church, Oxford (1725). He succeeded his father in 1716.

He was appointed High Sheriff of Yorkshire for 1740–41 and elected MP for Horsham in a by-election in 1748, sitting until 1768. He bought Chevet Hall near Wakefield from his sister-in-law, Anne, where he lived until his death.

He died unmarried in 1778 and was buried at Wakefield. He was succeeded by his brother Sir Michael Pilkington, 6th Baronet.

References

1700s births
1778 deaths
People educated at Westminster School, London
Alumni of Christ Church, Oxford
Members of the Parliament of Great Britain for English constituencies
Baronets in the Baronetage of Nova Scotia
British MPs 1747–1754
British MPs 1754–1761
British MPs 1761–1768
High Sheriffs of Yorkshire